Since the introduction of Crayola drawing crayons by Binney & Smith in 1903, more than 200 distinctive colors have been produced in a wide variety of assortments. The table below represents all of the colors found in regular Crayola assortments from 1903 to the present. Since the introduction of fluorescent crayons in the 1970s, the standard colors have been complemented by a number of specialty crayon assortments, represented in subsequent tables.

Standard colors

Specialty crayons 
Along with the regular packs of crayons, there have been many specialty sets, including Silver Swirls, Gem Tones, Pearl Brite Crayons, Metallic FX Crayons, Magic Scent Crayons, Silly Scents, and more.

Fluorescent crayons
In 1972, Binney & Smith introduced eight Crayola fluorescent crayons, designed to fluoresce under black light. The following year, they were added to the 72-count box, which had previously contained two of the eight most-used colors, in place of the duplicate crayons. These crayons remained steady until 1990, when all eight were renamed, and eight more were added, for a total of 16 fluorescent crayons. One of the new colors, Hot Magenta, shared a name with one of the original colors, now Razzle Dazzle Rose. For some reason, two of the original eight fluorescent crayons have the same color as two of the newer crayons. In 1992, the fluorescent colors were added to the new No. 96 box, becoming part of the standard lineup. When four new crayons were added to the No. 96 assortment in 2003, four existing colors were discontinued, including two of the fluorescents. Also beginning in 1993, packs of fluorescent crayons were regularly labeled "neon" or "neons".

Fabric Crayons 
In 1976, Crayola released a pack of eight Fabric Crayons. Each crayon was named after a standard color. In 1980, "Light Blue" was discontinued and replaced with Black. The colors' hexadecimal values are currently unknown. The names of the colors are listed below:

Metallic Crayons (Canada) 

In 1987, Crayola released a pack of 16 Metallic Crayons in Canada. Four of the colors are named after four of the standard colors. Also, one of the colors is named before a Metallic FX color. The colors' hexadecimal values are currently unknown. The names of the colors are listed below:
Aged Copper
Aztec Gold
Bluetonium
Brass
Bronze
Cadmium Red
Cast Iron
Cobalt Blue
Copper
Gold
Kryptonite
Rust
Silver
Steel Blue
Tarnished Gold
Titanium

Silver Swirls 

In 1990, Crayola released Silver Swirls, a pack of 24 silvery colors. The colors' hexadecimal values are approximated below.

Multicultural Crayons 

In 1992, Crayola released a set of eight Multicultural Crayons which "come in an assortment of skin hues that give a child a realistic palette for coloring their world." The eight colors used came from their standard list of colors (none of these colors are exclusive to this set), and the set was, for the most part, well received, though there has also been some criticism.

Magic Scent Crayons 

In 1994, Crayola produced a 16-pack of crayons that released fragrances when used. In 1995, Crayola changed some of the scents because of complaints received from parents that some of the crayons smelled good enough to eat, like the Cherry, Chocolate, and Blueberry scented crayons. Crayons with food scents were retired in favor of non-food scents. The 30 crayons all consisted of regular Crayola colors.

Gem Tones 

In 1994, Crayola released Gem Tones, a pack of 16 crayons modeled after the colors of gemstones. The colors' hexadecimal values are approximated below:

Glow in the Dark Crayons 
In 1994, Crayola released Glow in the Dark Crayons, a pack of eight crayons. However, it did not contain any color names in North America. Only four of the colors were available in the U.K.

Crayola Changeables 

The Crayola Changeables crayons were introduced in 1995. The chart includes the color changer, an off-white crayon that goes on clear and initiates the color changes in the other crayons from the "From color" to the "To color".

Color 'n Smell Crayons
Following previous issues with scented crayons in 1994 and 1995, Binney & Smith released a new line, known as "Magic Scent" crayons in 1997. None of the crayons were named after or given the scent of foods. The 16 crayons all consisted of regular Crayola colors.

Star Brite Crayons 
In 1997, Crayola released a 16-pack of Star Brite Crayons. However, it did not contain any color names. The hex triplets below are representative of the colors produced by the named crayons.

Color Mix-Up Crayons 
In 1997, Crayola released a 16-pack of Color Mix-Up Crayons, each of which contains a solid color with flecks of two other colors in it. Colors in the chart below are approximated. The hex RGB values are in the order of the predominant color and then the flecks. Colors for crayons other than Mixed Veggies and Star Spangled Banner come from information on the crayon wrapper.

Pearl Brite Crayons 

In 1997, Crayola released a 16-pack of Pearl Brite Crayons. These were designed to give soft pearlescent colors. These had a new wrapper design, black with a white oval Crayola logo and white text.

Crayons with Glitter 
In 1997, Crayola released Crayons with Glitter as part of a Special Effects crayons package. Starting as late as 1999, their crayon names do not appear on the crayon wrappers. In the below list, the background represents crayon color, and the highlighted "square of glitter" around text represents glitter color.

In 2019, Crayola released an updated version of Crayons with Glitter in a 24-count pack featuring new names:

Construction Paper Crayons 
In 1998, Crayola introduced Construction Paper Crayons. The specialty line remained one of the longest running specialty lines they ever put out. The hex triplets below are representative of the colors produced by the named crayons.

Metallic FX Crayons 

In 2001, Crayola produced Metallic FX Crayons, a set of 16 metallic crayons whose names were chosen through a contest open to residents of the U.S. and Canada. The hex triplets below are representative of the colors produced by the named crayons. In 2019, an updated version was released under its original name of Metallic Crayons, adding eight more metallic colors for a total of 24. The original 16 colors are included in the special 152-count Ultimate Crayon Collection pack alongside 120 standard and 16 Crayons with Glitter. Four of the colors are included in the regular 96-count crayon box.

Gel FX Crayons 
In 2001, Crayola produced Gel FX Crayons. However, it did not contain any color names. Four of the colors are randomly included in the 96-count crayon box alongside four Metallic FX colors and are not included in the 152-count Ultimate Crayon Collection set. The hex triplets below are representative of the colors produced by the named crayons.

Pearl Crayons 
In 2019, a 24-count box of Pearl Crayons was released alongside the updated versions of the Metallic Crayons, Neon Crayons, and Crayons with Glitter.

Neon Crayons 
In 2019, a new 24 count of Neon Crayons was released. It includes eight fluorescent colors, eight pearl versions of the same colors, and the same eight colors with silver glitter.

Colors of the World Crayons 
On May 21, 2020, the Colors of the World Crayons were announced. They were released in 32 and 24-count boxes in July 2020. The additional eight colors are standard colors with new names to fit the theme.

Silly Scents Crayons 

The Silly Scents Crayons are produced by Crayola in a 16-pack. The 16 crayons all consisted of regular Crayola colors.

Heads 'n Tails Crayons 

The eight Heads 'n Tails Crayons are double-sided and encased in plastic tubes that function much like the ones on Crayola Twistables. Each crayon has two shades of color, for a total of 16 colors, which are approximated by the background colors and hex RGB values below.

The 100,000,000,000th Crayon 
In 1996, Crayola celebrated the creation of their 100 billionth crayon by publishing a Crayon called Blue Ribbon. This crayon was only present in certain crayon 96-packs.

Twistables

24-pack Mini Twistables
In 2004, Crayola released a set of 24 Mini Twistables crayons. They are nearly half the size of large twistable crayons. The colors' hexadecimal values are shown below. The colors are from the standard list of crayon colors.

Fun Effects Mini Twistables
In 2004, Crayola released a 24 pack of Fun Effects Mini Twistables crayons. It contains eight eXtreme colors, eight metallic colors, and eight rainbow colors.

True to Life Crayons 

In 2007, Crayola released a set of eight True to Life Crayons. Each crayon is extra-long and contained within a plastic casing similar to that of Crayola Twistables crayons. In the table, the background approximates the primary color and the text is in the two supporting colors. The approximate RGB hex values for each are given as well.

Confetti Crayon 
Released in 2020 this set of 24 crayons may appear white at first, but contain a confetti surprise when you lay it down on your paper! A crayon connoisseur describes them as "contain(g) tiny bubbles of color bursts in each crayon, basically 3 crayons in one." There very unique names are listed below.

New Year's Eve
Meteor Shower
Fourth of July
Clambake
Flamingo Festival
Carnival Corn
Carden Soiree
Winter Gala
Magenta Fiesta
Summertime
Blizzard Blast
Mermaid Pageant
Cupcake Sparkles
Sunset Luau
Party Fish
Campfire Jamboree
At The Circus
Spring Break
Lime-a Palooza
Tweed Jubilee
Pool party,
Rain Drops
Birthday Child
Rose Parade

See also 
 History of Crayola crayons
 Timeline of Crayola
 Lists of colors

Notes

References 

List of Crayola colors, crayon
Crayola crayon
Crayola crayon